University of the West Indies Football Club (commonly abbreviated UWI F.C.), is a Jamaican association football club based at the Mona campus of the University of the West Indies, near Kingston. They were promoted to the National Premier League for first time after the 2014–15 season. During their first season in Jamaica's top division in 2015–16, the club finished one point out of the championship play-offs.

Players

References 

 
Uwi